Eatinger is a surname. Notable people with the surname include:

Robert Eatinger (born 1957), American lawyer
Stephen Eatinger, American country music artist